Sombor is a city and the administrative center of the West Bačka District in the autonomous province of Vojvodina, Serbia. The city has a total population of 47,623, while its administrative area (including neighboring villages) has 85,903 inhabitants.

Name and etymology
In Serbian, the city is known as Sombor (Сомбор), in Hungarian and German as Zombor, in Croatian and Bunjevac as Sombor, in Rusyn as Zombor (Зомбор), and in Turkish as Sonbor.

The older Hungarian name for the city was Czoborszentmihály. The name originates from the Czobor family, who were the owners of this area in the 14th century. (The family name came from the Slavic name Cibor.) The Serbian name for the city (Sombor) also came from the family name Czobor, and was first recorded in 1543, although the city was mentioned in historical documents under several more names, such as Samobor, Sambor, Sambir, Sonbor, Sanbur, Zibor, and Zombar.

An unofficial Serbian name used for the city is Ravangrad (Раванград), which means "flat town" in Serbian.

History

The first historical record relating to the city is from 1340. The city was administered by the Kingdom of Hungary until the 16th century, when it became part of the Ottoman Empire. During the establishment of Ottoman authority, the local Hungarian population left the region. As a result, the city became populated mostly by ethnic Serbs. It was called "Sonbor" during Ottoman administration and was a kaza centre in the Sanjak of Segedin at first in Budin Province until 1596, and then in Eğri Province between 1596 and 1687.

In 1665, a well-known traveller, Evliya Çelebi, visited Sombor and wrote: "All the folk (in the city) are not Hungarian, but Wallachian-Christian (Serb). These places are something special; they do not belong to Hungary, but are a part of Bačka and Wallachia. Most of the inhabitants are traders, and all of them wear frontiersmen clothes; they are very polite and brave people." According to Celebi, the city had 200 shops, 14 mosques and about 2,000 houses.

Since 12 September 1687, the city was under Habsburg administration, and was included into the Habsburg Military Frontier. Ottomans attempted to recapture it during the Battle of Zenta on 11 September 1697. However their attack was repulsed. In 1717, the first Orthodox elementary school was opened. Five years later a Roman Catholic elementary school was opened as well. In 1745, Sombor was excluded from the Military Frontier and was included into Bacsensis County. In 1749, Sombor gained royal free city status. In 1786, the city became the seat of Bacsensis-Bodrogiensis County. According to 1786 data, the population of the city numbered 11,420 people, mostly Serbs.

According to the 1843 data, Sombor had 21,086 inhabitants, of whom 11,897 were Orthodox Christians, 9,082 Roman Catholics, 56 Jewish, and 51 Protestants. The main language spoken in the city at that time was Serbian, and the second-largest language was German. In 1848/1849, Sombor was part of the Serbian Vojvodina, a Serb autonomous region within Austrian Empire, while between 1849 and 1860, it was part of the Voivodeship of Serbia and Temes Banat, a separate Austrian crown land. Sombor was a seat of the district within voivodship. After the abolishment of this crown land, Sombor again became the seat of the Bacsensis-Bodrogiensis (Bács-Bodrog, Bačka-Bodrog) County.

According to the 1910 census, the population of Sombor was 30,593 people, of whom 11,881 spoke Serbian, 10,078 spoke Hungarian, 6,289 spoke Bunjevac, and 2,181 spoke German.

In 1918, Sombor became part of the Kingdom of Serbs, Croats and Slovenes (later known as the Kingdom of Yugoslavia). Between 1918 and 1922 it was part of Bačka County, between 1922 and 1929 part of Bačka Oblast, and between 1929 and 1941 part of Danube Banovina.

In 1941, the city was occupied by the Axis powers and annexed by Hungary. Many prominent citizens from the Serb community were interned and later executed. In 1944, the Yugoslav Partisans and Soviet Red Army expelled the Axis forces from the city. Since 1944, Sombor was part of the Autonomous Province of Vojvodina of the new Socialist Yugoslavia and (since 1945) socialist Serbia. Today, Sombor is the seat of the West Bačka District in the Autonomous Province of Vojvodina in the Republic of Serbia.

Geography

Climate
Climate in this area has mild differences between highs and lows, and there is adequate rainfall year-round.  The Köppen Climate Classification subtype for this climate is "Cfb" (Marine West Coast Climate/Oceanic climate).

Settlements

The city administrative area of Sombor includes following villages:

Aleksa Šantić
Bački Breg
Bački Monoštor
Bezdan
Gakovo
Doroslovo
Kljajićevo
Kolut
Rastina
Riđica
Svetozar Miletić
Stanišić
Stapar
Telečka
Čonoplja

Smaller and suburban settlements, "Salaši" include
Bukovački Salaši
Rančevo
Kruševlje
Bilić
Lugomerci
Žarkovac
Šaponje
 Obzir
 Milčići
 Gradina
 Lenija
 Nenadić
 Radojevići

Demographics

According to the last official census done in 2011, the city of Sombor has 85,903 inhabitants.

Ethnic groups

Settlements with Serb ethnic majority (as of 2002) are: Sombor, Aleksa Šantić, Gakovo, Kljajićevo, Kolut, Rastina, Riđica, Stanišić, Stapar, and Čonoplja. Settlements with Croat/Šokac ethnic majority (as of 2002) are: Bački Breg and Bački Monoštor. Settlements with Hungarian ethnic majority (in 2002) are: Bezdan, Doroslovo, and Telečka. Ethnically mixed settlement with relative Hungarian majority is Svetozar Miletić.

The ethnic composition of the city:

Culture

Sombor is famous for its greenery, cultural life and beautiful 18th and 19th century center. The most important cultural institutions are the National Theater, the Regional Museum, the Modern Art Gallery, the Milan Konjović Art Gallery, the Teacher's College, the Serbian Reading House, and the Grammar School. Teacher's College, founded in 1778, is the oldest college in Serbia and the region.

Sombor's rich history includes the oldest institution for higher education in Serbian. The town is also home of numerous minority organisations, including the Hungarian Pocket Theater Berta Ferenc, the Croatian Society Vladimir Nazor, the Jewish Municipality and several other smaller organisations including German and Romani clubs.

There are two monasteries in this city:
 Sombor Orthodox Monastery, founded in 1928–1933
 Carmelite Catholic monastery, founded in 1904

Buildings and architecture

Economy
The following table gives a preview of total number of registered people employed in legal entities per their core activity (as of 2018):

Sports
Radnički Sombor is the main football club from the city competing in Vojvodina League North.

Sombor is the hometown of two-time NBA MVP Nikola Jokić.

Local media

Newspapers
 Somborske novine

TV stations
 K-54
 Spektar
 RTV Sreće

Radio stations
 Radio Marija (95,7)
 Radio Sombor (97.5)
 Radio Fortuna (106.6)

Internet media
 Novi Radio Sombor http://www.noviradiosombor.com/
 SOinfo.org

Twin cities
Twin cities:
 Baja, Hungary
 Kispest, Hungary
 Veles, North Macedonia

Regional cooperation:
 Osijek, Croatia
 Tuzla, Bosnia and Herzegovina
 Vukovar, Croatia

Transportation

Buses
Buses offer direct connections to major Serbian cities including Belgrade, Novi Sad and Subotica, as well as many regional towns. Among the companies operating in the area is Severtrans.

Rail
Sombor is linked by direct rail links to Novi Sad and Subotica, among others.

Air
The city houses Sombor Airport.

Notable residents
 Nikola Jokić (b. 1995), Serbian professional basketball player, two-time NBA Most Valuable Player (2021, 2022) and Olympic silver medalist
 It was the seat of Ferenc Redl, an administrator from Bačka, from 1750.
 Joseph Schweidel was born here on May 18, 1796. Home Guard General, Martyr of Arad, his statue stood in the square in front of the County Hall until 1918. 
 Lazar "Laza" Kostić (1841–1910), Serbian poet, prose writer, lawyer, philosopher, polyglot, publicist, and politician, considered to be one of the greatest minds of Serbian literature
 Samuilo Maširević
 Antal Koch was born here on January 7, 1843. Geologist, petrographer, mineralogist, paleontologist, member of the Hungarian Academy of Sciences.  
 Ernest Bošnjak (1876–1963), cameraman, film director and printer. One of the founders of the filmography in the area
 Sándor Gombos (1895–1968), Olympic champion fencer
 Milan Konjović (1898–1993), prominent Serbian painter
 Gustav Mezey (1899–1981), artist
 Sava Stojkov (1925–2014), Serbian naive art painter
 Zvonko Bogdan (b. 1942), Bunjevac performer of traditional folk songs
 Filip Krajinović (b. 1992), Serbian professional tennis player
 Radivoj Korać (1938–1969), basketball player in the FIBA Hall Of Fame
 Nemanja Milić (b. 1990), Serbian professional football player
 Bogdan Maglić (1928–2017), nuclear physicist
 Andrija Konc (1919–1945), Croatian singer in the 1940s, born in Sombor.

See also
 List of cities in Serbia
 List of cities, towns and villages of Vojvodina
 West Bačka District

References

External links

 
 www.soinfo.org
 www.sombor.org.rs
 Map of Sombor

 
Places in Bačka
Populated places in Vojvodina
Municipalities and cities of Vojvodina
West Bačka District
Spatial Cultural-Historical Units of Great Importance